Barbara Dawson Smith is an American writer of historical romance novels. She also writes under the pen name Olivia Drake.

Biography
Barbara Dawson Smith obtained a degree in journalism at Michigan State University. Shortly after graduating she sold her first historical romance only two weeks after sending it to a publisher and joined the Romance Writers of America in 1981.

Smith lives in Houston, Texas with her husband and their two daughters.

Awards
Dreamspinner: 1990 "Best Historical Romantic Suspense" from Romantic Times
A Glimpse of Heaven: 1995 "Best Regency Historical" from Romantic Times
Tempt Me Twice: 2002 RITA Award Best Short Historical

Bibliography

As Barbara Dawson Smith

Single novels
No Regrets	(1985)
Stolen Heart (1988)
Silver Splendor (1989)
Dreamspinner (1990)
A Glimpse of Heaven (1995)
Never a Lady (1996)
Once Upon a Scandal (1997)
Her Secret Affair (1998)
Too Wicked to Love(1999)
Seduced by a Scoundrel (1999)
The Duchess Diaries (2005)
Countess Confidential (2006)
The Rogue Report {2006}

Defiant Fletcher Series
Defiant Embrace (1985)
Defiant Surrender (1987)

Fire Coleridge Series
Fire on the Wind (1992)
Fire at Midnight (1992)

Rosebuds Series
Romancing the Rogue (2000)
Tempt Me Twice (2001)
With All My Heart (2002)
One Wild Night (2003)
The Wedding Night (2004)

Anthologies in collaboration
"Candle in the Snow" in CHRISTMAS ROMANCE (1990) – with Catherine Hart and Betina Krahn
"Beauty and the Brute" in SCANDALOUS WEDDINGS (1998) – with Rexanne Becnel, Jill Jones and Brenda Joyce

As Olivia Drake

Heiress in London Series
Seducing the Heiress (2009)
Never Trust a Rogue (2010)
Scandal of the Year (2011)

Cinderella Sisterhood Series
If the Slipper Fits (2012)
Stroke of Midnight (2013)
Abducted by a Prince (2014)
 Bella and the Beast (2015)
 His Wicked Wish (2016)
The Scandalous Flirt (2017)

Unlikely Duchesses Series 
 The Duke I Once Knew (2018)
 Forever My Duke (2019)
When a Duke Loves a Governess (2021)

References and Resources

External links
Barbara Dawson Smith's Official Website

Barbara Dawson Smith in FantasticFiction

20th-century American novelists
21st-century American novelists
American romantic fiction writers
American women novelists
Living people
Year of birth missing (living people)
Place of birth missing (living people)
RITA Award winners
20th-century American women writers
21st-century American women writers
Pseudonymous women writers
20th-century pseudonymous writers
21st-century pseudonymous writers